Ringo Starr and His All Starr Band Volume 2: Live from Montreux is Ringo Starr's second official live album and was released in September 1993.

Live and content
Starr was once again supported by his All-Starr Band, but this time the celebrity guests had been shuffled somewhat. Retained from the original 1989/1990 inaugural line-up were Joe Walsh and Nils Lofgren. Newcomers were Burton Cummings, Timothy B. Schmit, Dave Edmunds, Todd Rundgren, Tim Cappello on saxophone and Starr's own son, Zak Starkey, on drums.

While Starr performed new material from Time Takes Time, he mostly centered on his Beatles' standards on this occasion, namely "Yellow Submarine", "With A Little Help From My Friends" and his cover of The Shirelles' "Boys", which had appeared on The Beatles' first album, Please Please Me, in 1963. The members of his All-Starr Band also had solo moments during the live recording.

Release

Following up on the 1990 album Ringo Starr and His All-Starr Band, this new collection was a recording of a performance in Montreux in 1992, shortly after the release of Starr's studio album Time Takes Time. Ringo Starr and His All Starr Band Volume 2: Live from Montreux was released worldwide on Rykodisc, on 14 September 1993, eventually being deleted towards the end of the 1990s. To help promote the album, Starr appeared on NBC's Today television show, on 13 October 1993. Due to his heavy involvement in The Beatles Anthology, it was Starr's last official release until Vertical Man in 1998. In between these releases, Starr orchestrated a limited edition live release of his 1995 tour exclusively through the Blockbuster video store chain in 1997.

Track listing

Personnel
Ringo Starr and His All-Starr Band
 Ringo Starr – drums, vocals
 Joe Walsh – guitars, vocals
 Nils Lofgren – guitars, vocals
 Dave Edmunds – guitars, vocals
 Todd Rundgren – guitars, vocals
 Burton Cummings – keyboards, vocals
 Timothy B. Schmit – bass, vocals
 Tim Cappello – saxophone
 Zak Starkey – drums

References
Footnotes

Citations

External links
Ringo Starr and His All Starr Band: Live From Montreux site

1993 live albums
Ringo Starr live albums
Rykodisc live albums
Albums produced by Ringo Starr
Ringo Starr & His All-Starr Band
albums recorded at the Montreux Jazz Festival